Chlosyne marina, the red-spotted patch or marina checkerspot, is a butterfly of the family Nymphalidae. It is found in Mexico. Rare strays can be found as far north as southern Arizona and southern Texas.

The wingspan is 33–35 mm. Adults feed on flower nectar.

Subspecies
Chlosyne marina marina (Mexico)
Chlosyne marina melitaeoides (C. & R. Felder, 1867) (Mexico)
Chlosyne marina eumeda (Godman & Salvin, 1894) (Mexico)

References

External links

marina
Butterflies of North America
Butterflies described in 1837
Taxa named by Carl Geyer